John Ochsendorf (born May 22, 1974) is an American educator, structural engineer, and historian of construction; he is a professor in the Department of Architecture and the Department of Civil and Environmental Engineering at the Massachusetts Institute of Technology. He is widely known for becoming a MacArthur Fellow in 2008 He served as the Director of the American Academy in Rome from 2017–2020. In 2022, he was appointed the founding director of the newly-created MIT Morningside Academy for Design.

Early years and education
Ochsendorf grew up in Elkins, West Virginia; he was educated at Elkins High School, Cornell University, Princeton University, and the University of Cambridge. His university degrees are in structural engineering and he minored in archaeology at Cornell.

He also studied in Spain as a predoctoral scholar under the Fulbright Program in 2000–2001.

Career

Ochsendorf joined the MIT faculty in 2002, and holds a joint appointment in the MIT Department of Civil and Environmental Engineering (CEE) and the Department of Architecture. He teaches both undergraduate and graduate courses, and serves on a number of faculty committees.

Ochsendorf is known for using architecture and engineering to study and restore ancient structures and sometimes draws upon ancient building methods for the benefit of modern construction.  He has studied Incan simple suspension bridges and the earthquake-worthiness of Gothic cathedrals.

Ochsendorf also curated an exhibition Palaces for the People, featuring the history and legacy of Guastavino tile construction, which premiered in September 2012 at the Boston Public Library, Rafael Guastavino's first major architectural work in America.  The exhibition then traveled to the National Building Museum in Washington DC, and an expanded version appeared at the Museum of the City of New York.  Ochsendorf, a winner of the MacArthur Foundation "genius grant", also wrote the book-length color-illustrated monograph Guastavino vaulting : the art of structural tile, and an online exhibition coordinated with the traveling exhibits.

In addition, Ochsendorf directs the Guastavino Project at MIT, which researches and maintains the Guastavino.net online archive of related materials.

In 2022, it was announced that Ochsendorf will be founding director of the new MIT Morningside Academy for Design, an interdisciplinary center which will be part of the School of Architecture and Planning (SA+P). Initial funding came from a $100 million gift from The Morningside Foundation, the philanthropic arm of the T.H. Chan family.

Sean Collier Memorial
On April 29, 2015, MIT held special ceremonies dedicating the Sean Collier Memorial in honor of MIT Police officer Sean Collier, who had been killed by Boston Marathon bombers Tamerlan and Dzhokhar Tsarnaev two years earlier. Ochsendorf and his students were deeply involved with the structural engineering of the design, which was led by J. Meejin Yoon, the head of the MIT Department of Architecture. The memorial consists of 32 massive granite blocks precision-shaped under computer numerical control, and fitted together into a shallow open domed arch with 5 radial support wings splayed out like fingers of an open hand.

Personal life
From 2010–2017, Ochsendorf and his wife Anne Carney served as housemasters of the MIT graduate student dormitory called "The Warehouse". He is an enthusiastic soccer player, and enjoys hiking, cycling, and camping. He has lived in Australia, England, Spain, and Italy, and enjoys travel.

Awards
 2008 American Academy in Rome fellow in Historic Preservation & Conservation.
 2008 MacArthur Fellows Program
 2011 Senior Fellow of the Design Futures Council.

Published works
Guastavino Vaulting: The Art of Structural Tile (Princeton Architectural Press, 2010)

References

External links

 Ochsendorf's Masonry Group website at Massachusetts Institute of Technology

1974 births
Alumni of the University of Cambridge
American architectural historians
American male non-fiction writers
Cornell University alumni
Educators from West Virginia
Living people
MacArthur Fellows
MIT School of Architecture and Planning faculty
People from Elkins, West Virginia
Princeton University alumni
Structural engineers
Engineers from West Virginia
MIT School of Engineering faculty